The Roman Catholic Diocese of Moshi is a diocese located in the city of Moshi in the Ecclesiastical province of Arusha in Tanzania.

History
 September 13, 1910: Established as Apostolic Vicariate of Kilima-Njaro from the Apostolic Vicariate of Bagamoyo
 March 25, 1953: Promoted as Diocese of Moshi

Special churches
The Cathedral is Christ the King Cathedral in Moshi.

Bishops

Ordinaries
 Vicars Apostolic of Kilima-Njaro (Roman rite)
 Bishop Marie-Joseph-Aloys Munsch, C.S.Sp. (1910.09.13 – 1922.01.16)
 Bishop Henry Aloysius (Enrico) Gogarty, C.S.Sp. (1923.11.28 – 1931.12.08)
 Bishop Joseph James Byrne, C.S.Sp. (1932.11.29 – 1953.03.25); see below
 Bishops of Moshi (Roman rite)
 Bishop Joseph James Byrne, C.S.Sp. (1953.03.25 – 1959.05.15); see above
 Bishop Joseph Kilasara, C.S.Sp. (1960.01.12 – 1966.11.03)
 Bishop Joseph Sipendi (1968.01.11 – 1985.04.29)
 Bishop Amedeus Msarikie (1986.03.21 – 2007.11.21)
 Bishop Isaac Amani Massawe (2007.11.21 - 2017.12.27), appointed Archbishop of Arusha
 Bishop Ludovick Joseph Minde, ALCP/OSS (2019.12.02 - )

See also
Roman Catholicism in Tanzania

Sources
 GCatholic.org
 Catholic Hierarchy

External links
 http://www.moshidiocese.org

Moshi
Christian organizations established in 1910
Roman Catholic dioceses and prelatures established in the 20th century
Moshi, Roman Catholic Diocese of